Chase is the fourth album from pop group Djumbo.

Track listing
 Chase
 I Wanna Kiss You
 No Way
 Round
 Look at the Sun
 All Day
 Disco
 Sjans
 Fiësta
 Oh No
 Wonder Of It All
 Summertime In Dubai
 Oorlogskind

Singles
 Oorlogskind (20 June 2009)
 Summertime In Dubai (16 August 2009)
 Chase (22 Mai 2010)
 Sjans (25 October 2010)

References

2010 albums
Djumbo albums